Bob Ayala was an American Contemporary Christian musician from Los Angeles, California.

Robert Steven "Bob" Ayala (born March 9, 1951, died November 22, 2020) was born and raised in Whittier, California. As a teenager, Bob played in two different rock bands, along with his friend Den DeMaio. Shortly after graduating from high school, during the Jesus Movement in September 1969, Bob had an encounter with Jesus Christ that transformed his life, giving him newfound hope and joy. Bob had heard the Gospel message partly through the ministry of Gene Scott, a Los Angeles preacher who then was a part of the Assemblies of God. Upon giving his life to Christ, Bob left his rock band and started performing publicly in Christian coffee houses, the first being Salt Company in Los Angeles in late 1969. He was a regular at a Christian coffee house in Downtown Whittier. Later, he began playing at Calvary Chapel Costa Mesa, along with several other up-and-coming Contemporary Christian Musicians. Within weeks of Bob's conversion, he met a girl named Carol Agee at a local donut shop, and right away became fascinated with Bible prophecy and the end times, learning much from Carol's mother, Marilyn Agee, a noted Biblical prophecy enthusiast.

In 1971 Bob met Pamela ("Pam") Jean Vandevier and they married on August 25, 1972, in Whittier. Pam began traveling with Bob throughout California and Arizona doing Christian concerts. They performed together as a folk duo.

Bob was born with a genetic disease called Retinitis pigmentosa. The slow onset began with tunnel vision in his early teenage years, and by the time he reached his forties he was completely blind. Although he could still see as a young man, he began learning brail, knowing his disease would eventually lead to total blindness, although he didn't follow through with using it. In that day, jobs for blind people were very limited. One option for him was stocking snack and drink machines at local malls, the thought of which discouraged Bob. At one point he worked at a photo developing shop, removing exposed rolls of film from disposable cameras.

Recognizing Bob's musical potential, his father challenged him to begin writing songs, enough to produce an entire record album, so Bob took his advise and focused on the goal. Not long after completing the task, circumstances came into place and the opportunity came for him to sign with a record company.

Bob released his first album in 1976, Joy By Surprise, which was recorded by Buddy King and featured members of Koinonia and his own sister, Shirley, as guests. Following the success of his first album, Bob was voted "Best New Artist" in a poll by CCM in 1976. He released two albums on Myrrh Records soon after. Bob's love for C.S. Lewis' books were evident in his early compositions, some of his songs and album themes reflecting Lewis' allegorical Christian writings.

Sometime during Bob Ayala's early career in the 1970s he toured with Andraé Crouch throughout the United States, opening for him at each concert. In 1981, Bob, along with his wife Pam, did a concert tour of Australia. At that time he was primarily performing songs from his recently released album "Journey."

Although the two never met, Bob Ayala and Keith Green were fond of each other's music, and had the same booking agent. Keith, whose ministry was called Last Days Ministries (LDM), often listened to Bob's music while criss-crossing the country in his tour bus. After Keith's death in July 1982, the leaders of LDM organized the Keith Green Memorial Concert tour and one of the leaders, Wayne Dillard, called Ayala asking him if he would sing at the Los Angeles concert, which he did. Pleased with his music ministry at that concert, he was asked to sing at the San Diego concert. Before it was over, Bob had travelled across the United States and Canada, participating in 120 concerts altogether.

In October through December 1983, Bob and Pam Ayala attended Last Days Ministries' "Intensive Christian Training" (ICT) discipleship school near Lindale, Texas. After spending the Christmas & New Year's holidays back in California, the Ayalas moved to East Texas, sensing a calling from the Lord to serve full-time at LDM. While at the ministry, Bob recorded his album "Rescued" on Keith Green's "Pretty Good Records" record label. During his time at LDM, Bob led in worship during ministry meetings, did occasional concert tours, and became active in the anti-abortion movement with Americans Against Abortion, a branch of LDM. Bob Ayala was also active in LDM's "Christian Artist's Retreat," a summer gathering of fellow Christian musicians, including Dallas Holm, 2nd Chapter of Acts, Harvest, and many others, held annually from 1984 into the early 1990s. In the spring of 1987, Bob became part of the LDM leadership council, serving in that capacity through mid-1990.

In early 1985, Bob and Pam Ayala, who had been unable to conceive children, were thrilled to adopt a baby boy. A few years later they adopted special needs siblings, a boy and a girl, whose mother had been a drug addict. Finally, after trying to conceive for 20 years, Bob and Pam gave birth to a son in late 1992. During the mid-to-late 1990s, Bob and Pam adopted their last child, a baby girl.

In early 1992, the Ayala family left Last Days Ministries and bought a house north of the community of Jamestown, Texas. There he continued to compose Christian music and, with the help of his young son Casey, produced two albums on his own Creation Heart Music label. Bob continued doing concerts nationwide, most of the time traveling alone. Also in the early 1990s Bob signed with Integrity Music as a songwriter, composing scripture songs.

During their time in East Texas, for several years the Ayalas were active members of Community Christian Fellowship (CCF), a non-denominational church located in the community of Garden Valley. In 1987-1988 the pastor of CCF was Albie Pearson, a former Los Angeles Angels baseball player, whom Bob had followed in his youth, being a fan of baseball. For a couple of years during the mid-to-late 1990s the Ayalas attended nearby Garden Valley Community Church.

In July 2000, the couple and their five children moved to Nashua, New Hampshire where Bob served as a worship pastor at Grace Fellowship Church. In Nashua, on May 13, 2008, Bob lost his dear Pam to cancer. His church family and friends stepped up to the plate, helping Bob and his children in many caring ways. At the end of 2016, Bob retired and moved back to East Texas, living with his son Casey and his family near Lindale, Texas.

In late October 2020, Bob travelled to Southern California for an extended visit with family, intending to fly back to Texas after Christmas. While visiting his sister in Apple Valley, Bob died unexpectedly on Sunday, Nov. 22nd at the age of 69. Bob had been experiencing balance problems and vertigo, likely causing his fall while showering that morning.

Discography
Joy By Surprise (Pure Joy Records, 1976)
Wood Between the Worlds (Myrrh Records, 1978)
Journey (Myrrh, 1980)
Rescued (Pretty Good Records, 1985)
Meet Me At The Summit (Creation Heart Music, 1996)
Who Was This Man (Creation Heart Music, 1997)
Then and Now (Creation Heart Music, 2012)

References

American male singers
Musicians from Los Angeles
Myrrh Records artists
Performers of contemporary Christian music
Blind musicians
American male songwriters
Singers from California
Songwriters from California